Rathnew GAA are a Gaelic football club in Rathnew, County Wicklow, Ireland.

History
Rathnew's current coach is Harry Murphy.

Achievements
 Leinster Senior Club Football Championships: (1)
 2001
 Wicklow Senior Football Championships: (34)
 1893, 1896, 1897, 1902, 1904, 1905, 1906, 1909, 1910, 1911, 1921, 1924, 1928, 1932, 1941, 1942, 1943, 1970, 1978, 1996, 1997, 1998, 1999, 2000, 2001, 2002, 2003, 2005, 2009, 2010,  2013, 2014, 2015  & 2017.
 Wicklow Senior Hurling Championships: (11)
  1906, 1911, 1913, 1925, 1929, 1932, 1933, 1934, 1937, 1939, 1950

Current panel
 Peter Dignam
 Paul Merrigan
 Damien Power
 Jamie Snell
 JT Moorehouse
 Ross O'Brien
 John Manley
 James Stafford
 Theo Smyth
 Eddie Doyle (c)
 Jody Merrigan
 Danny Staunton
 Nicky Mernagh
 Mark Doyle
 Leighton Glynn 
 Stephen Byrne
 Enan Glynn
 Graham Merrigan
 Chris Healy
 Warren Kavanagh

Notable players
Harry Murphy

External links
Rathnew GAA

References

Gaelic games clubs in County Wicklow
Gaelic football clubs in County Wicklow
Hurling clubs in County Wicklow